Dan Forshaw (born 19 May 1981) is an English jazz musician and music educator who started his career aged sixteen. He plays the tenor, soprano and alto saxophone and has also recorded on bass clarinet and the Electronic Wind Instrument or EWI.  He is a passionate advocate for improving and facilitating music education for both adults and children, and is a figure in the digital revolution sweeping through music education.

Background
Forshaw was born in Blackpool, Lancashire, into a musical family. He grew up in nearby Fleetwood and began playing piano at an early age. He attended Stanah Primary School, in Thornton, where he first started playing the clarinet aged seven. He progressed onto the saxophone aged ten, before attending St. Aidan's C of E High School in Preesall near Poulton-le-Fylde, and then onto the Blackpool Sixth Form College, where he starred in their big band.  He later studied music and politics at Lancaster University.

Career

Forshaw's first professional gig was with 'The Amazing Blues Brothers Soul Revue' with whom he appeared across the UK and Europe. Dan then became director of Big Party, an event management and promotion company, before leaving in 2002 when he was appointed Director of Jazz studies at the Beecham Music School, Rossall School in Fleetwood.

In 2005 Dan traveled to New York City, where he studied with saxophonist, composer and bandleader, Branford Marsalis, saxophonist Eric Alexander and post-bop jazz saxophonist, Ravi Coltrane. Upon returning from New York, Dan moved from Blackpool to London. During his time in London he studied at the London School of Theology (LST). Whilst at LST he was also the music co-ordinator at Beechen Grove Baptist Church in Watford and a private music tutor in Harefield.

In January 2008 the Dan Forshaw Quartet performed their Jazz: Loving the Supreme project, which was the culmination of Dan's studies at London School of Theology.  The work was based on the seminal John Coltrane album A Love Supreme and was performed in the chapel at the LST.

In February 2008, Dan was appointed as Artistic director, and Artist in residence at Urban Soul, May Street Church, Belfast in Northern Ireland. Whilst living in Northern Ireland Dan also toured with Pop artist Yazz and was active on the small, but vibrant Irish Jazz Scene. Forshaw continued to perform at many jazz festivals across the UK, including the Southport International Jazz festival from 2002 - 2012.

In 2011 Forshaw returned to England, where he joined the King / Cave project, an experimental liturgical group fusing jazz, progressive rock and Anglican Liturgy. The group have performed all over the UK and beyond, notable performances being at St. Paul's Cathedral, London, Hereford Cathedral and Greenbelt Festival.  Dan also created his own Jazz Vespers project which traces the history of jazz and blue music using readings, poetry and song to tell the story of lament and redemption, this was most notably given at Ely Cathedral in October 2013  and Methodist Central Hall, Westminster as part of Black History Month in October 2014. In 2016 Dan released 'Jazz Vespers' which features some of the best UK Jazz talent alongside Dan.

In 2015 Dan was part of the critically acclaimed 'Passion - a contemporary journey to the cross' which fused Dance, Poetry and Music which toured six UK cathedrals and appeared at the Edinburgh Fringe Festival.

Forshaw now lives in Cambridgeshire where he has founded a Music Education programme called 'Cambridge Saxophone.com,' which enables students from all over the world, (including one student in Antarctica) to study with Dan via Skype and videos.  Forshaw also teaches saxophone for Cambridge University and maintains an active performing schedule across the UK and Europe.

Discography
As leader
2003 Question 21 - ReHab Records
2005 Live at the Villa - ReHab Records
2005 Time Stood Still (with Mike Taylor) - 4shaw Music
2006 Message (with Chris Smith) - 4shaw Music
2007 Language of Emotion 4shaw Music
2008 "Live in London EP" 4shaw Music
2009 "No Jazz Please, We're British" 4shaw Music
2011 "Metanarrative" 4shaw Music
2011 "Come Sunday" 4shaw Music
2013 "What if Rupert Murdoch Liked Jazz?"
2014 "#jazztrio"
2016 "Jazz Vespers"

As a sideman
2001 K:OLN Espionage
2003 Jamestown Sound Didn't realise I was so close to the edge
2005 The Sound of Superstring Meanwhile, back at the Ranch
2011 DJ Yammin
2014 "Darn Funk Orchestra"
2015 Frankly Finbarr

References

1981 births
Living people
English jazz saxophonists
British male saxophonists
Musicians from Blackpool
People from Fleetwood
British jazz musicians
Alumni of the London School of Theology
21st-century saxophonists
21st-century British male musicians
British male jazz musicians